The Hungarian League Cup was an annual football tournament contested by clubs in the Hungarian League. It was created in 2007 and the competition only lasted for 8 seasons, being cancelled in 2015/2016.

Ligakupa Finals
The performance of various clubs is shown in the following table:

Performance

Performances by club

References

External links
Official site

 
2
Recurring sporting events established in 2007
National association football league cups
Recurring sporting events disestablished in 2015
2007 establishments in Hungary
2015 disestablishments in Hungary